Lamont J. Robinson Jr. is an American insurance agent, educator, and politician who is a Democratic State representative of the Illinois House of Representatives for the 5th district. The Chicago-based district includes all or parts of the Near North Side, Chicago Loop, Near South Side, Douglas, Grand Boulevard, and Greater Grand Crossing.

Robinson is the owner of two Allstate insurance agencies and is an adjunct professor at various City Colleges of Chicago campuses.

He is openly gay and is the first LGBTQ African-American person to serve in the Illinois legislature.

In 2019, Robinson completed Harvard Kennedy School's program for Senior Executives in State and Local Government as David Bohnett Leadership Fellow.

As of July 2, 2022, Representative Robinson is a member of the following committees:

 Appropriations - Human Services Committee (HAPH)
 (Chairman of) Cybersecurity, Data Analytics, & IT Committee (HCDA)
 Health Care Availability & Access Committee (HHCA)
 Prescription Drug Affordability Committee (HPDA)
 Public Utilities Committee (HPUB)
 Small Business, Tech Innovation, and Entrepreneurship Committee (SBTE)
 (Chairman of) Special Issues (AP) Subcommittee (HAPH-ISSU)
 Telecom/Video Subcommittee (HPUB-TVID)
 (Chairman of) Tourism Committee (SHTO)

Electoral history

References

External links
Representative Lamont J. Robinson, Jr. (D) at the Illinois General Assembly
 Campaign website

21st-century American politicians
African-American state legislators in Illinois
Clark Atlanta University alumni
Living people
Democratic Party members of the Illinois House of Representatives
National Louis University alumni
Politicians from Chicago
LGBT state legislators in Illinois
Gay politicians
LGBT African Americans
1982 births
21st-century African-American politicians
20th-century African-American people
American businesspeople in insurance